Chanabayaite is the first recognized triazolate mineral, having the formula .

Minor iron admixture is also present. It is also one of a few currently known minerals containing ammine groups, including also ammineite, joanneumite and shilovite. All the minerals are rare and were found in a single guano deposit in Chile, called Pabellón de Pica. A similar natural phase, formula , likely a precursor of chanabayaite, is described by Zubkova et al. 2016.

Crystal structure
The main features of the crystal structure of chanabayaite are:
 copper forms octahedra, part of which share corners
 1,2,4-triazolate anions link the octahedra

Association
Chanabayaite coexists with halite, joanneumite, nitratine, salammoniac and paragenetically-unrelated chalcopyrite. Chalcopyrite is present in an amphibole- and plagioclase-bearing gabbro, that contacts the guano deposit.

Formation
Three suggested processes account for the formation of chanabayaite:
 leaching of sodium from the precursor phase
 leaching of chlorine from the precursor phase
 partial dehydratation of the precursor phase

References

Copper minerals
Organic minerals
Orthorhombic minerals
Minerals in space group 74